Neogames is a Swedish role-playing game publisher situated in Gothenburg. They were, after the re-creation of Target Games, the largest RPG publisher in the country. Neogames are known for developing the three first editions of the fantasy RPG license Eon, a role-playing game set in a fairly standard fantasy setting with elves, dwarves and magic. In their product line is also the cyberpunk role-playing game Neotech.

The company founder is Carl Johan Ström. Neogames has published several fantasy novels, most of them linked to the world of Eon, by Andreas Roman and Dan Hörning. In 2006 the Neogames company was bought by Kim Vässmar and the headquarters moved to Gotland. Kim Vässmar is the current CEO.

References

External links
Neogames homepage 

Companies based in Gothenburg
Role-playing game publishing companies